FIRE or F.I.R.E. may stand for:

 FIRE economy, a segment of the stock market: Finance, Insurance, Real Estate
 FIRE movement, a lifestyle movement: Financial Independence, Retire Early
 Febrile infection-related epilepsy syndrome (FIRES), a rare form of epilepsy
 Fellowship of Independent Reformed Evangelicals, a network of Reformed Baptist churches
 Flyby of Io with Repeat Encounters, a proposed spacecraft mission to Jupiter's moon Io
 Foundation for Individual Rights and Expression (formerly Foundation for Individual Rights in Education), a civil liberties organization in the US
 Fully Integrated Robotised Engine, a series of engines produced by Fiat
 Future Internet Research and Experimentation, a program funded by the European Union
 FIRE (Maltese band), a rock band founded in 1998
 F.I.R.E., a 1991 shoot-em-up game developed by the Slovakian company Ultrasoft
 F.I.R.E. (Free Inspiring Rising Elements), a Hmong and Lao performance group with May Lee-Yang
 "F-I-R-E", a 2013 single by the American Christian group Press Play
 Future in Reverse (FIRE), a performance group founded by composer Huang Ruo
 Future Investors in Real Estate (F.I.R.E.), a student organization at Suffolk College of Arts and Sciences in Boston, Massachusetts, US

See also
Fire (disambiguation)